The Arizona Daily Star is the major morning daily newspaper that serves Tucson and surrounding districts of southern Arizona in the United States.

History
L. C. Hughes was the Arizona Territory governor and founder of the Arizona Star, in 1877. 
The precursor to the Arizona Daily Star was The Bulletin, the first daily newspaper published in Tucson. It was started March 1, 1877 by L.C. Hughes and Charles Tully, later publishers of The Star. The Bulletin was succeeded by The Arizona Tri-Weekly Star, under the same ownership March 29, 1877.

The Arizona Weekly Star was established June 28, 1877. A.E. Fay became co-editor with L.C. Hughes July 5, 1877, and on Aug. 23 of the same year Fay became the sole proprietor.

Hughes returned to The Star in January, 1879, first as co-publisher with Fay and a few months later as sole owner.

On June 26, 1879, The Arizona Daily Star was started. The first edition had the wrong date at the top of the page.

The Star moved its quarters from Maiden Lane to Church and Congress streets in Downtown Tucson July 28, 1881.

The Arizona Daily Star and The Arizona Weekly Star were placed in the control of The Star Publishing company Aug. 28, 1885. Hughes continued as editor and manager.

L.C. Hughes and family sold The Star to W.B. Kelly "and associates" in July 1907.

On Sept. 8, 1907, The Star issued the largest regular edition of a newspaper ever printed in Arizona. The Star passed onto the control and management of the State Consolidated Published company, headed by George H. Kelly.

In August, 1910, the Kelly interest sold its holdings in the State Consolidated Publishing company to Dr. James Douglas, then president of the Copper Queen Consolidated Mining company, which in 1917 was taken over, as the Copper Queen branch by the Phelps-Dodge corporation.

On Dec. 31, 1917, the Star moved its plant from North Church Street to 33 W. Congress Street.

The Star was purchased from the Phelps-Dodge corporation by William R. Mathews and Ralph E. Ellinwood on Nov. 1, 1924. Less the a year later, on Sept. 7, 1925, The Arizona Daily Star became a "seven-day-a-week" newspaper. Up to that time, it had been appearing daily except Monday.

On May 31, 1927, the fiftieth anniversary edition was published; five tons of paper used for 10,000 copies of the 64-page issue. During the years following this anniversary edition, The Star issued its annual special edition in connection with the Tucson Rodeo.

Ralph E. Ellinwood, editor and co-owner of The Star, dropped dead Aug. 30, 1930. William R. Mathews became editor.

On Dec. 18, 1933, The Star's building was almost totally destroyed by a fire beginning at 8 o’clock in the morning, causing a $60,000 loss. Offers of aid came from newspapers in Phoenix, Bisbee and Nogales while the blaze still burned. By 4 o’clock in the afternoon temporary headquarters established at Jackson and Stone avenue in the Old Pueblo club building, and arrangements were completed for using The Citizen's mechanical department and press. The following day, The Star issued as usual despite the fire. Pictures of the burning building were engraved and rushed by airplane from Phoenix and used in this issue—less than 24 hours after the fire. The paper carried 10 pages.

On Jan. 25, 1934, The Star moved its entire mechanical department back to the remodeled and rebuilt building that had burned. The one time in the history of the paper when it could not put out an extra, the Dillinger gang was captured in Tucson. The Star was commended by the Associated Press for “beating” all other services by over an hour in filing this national news on the Dillinger's capture.

William R. Mathews, editor of The Star, predicted the bombing of Pearl Harbor in an editorial Nov. 28, 1941.
His report ran in The Arizona Daily Star Sept. 18, 1945.

The owners of the Tucson Citizen, William A. Small Sr. and family, bought the Arizona Daily Star Jan. 5, 1965, and operated both newspapers. The Tucson Citizen was published daily except for Sunday, in the afternoon.

The Star was sold to the Pulitzer Publishing Company April 8, 1971.

The Star completed its move, along with the Tucson Citizen, which was not owned by the Pulitzer company, to a new building on South Park Avenue in April 1973. The two papers were in a joint operating agreement, in which they shared a press and building and some operations, while the newsrooms were entirely separate. The joint company was Tucson Newspapers Inc.

Seven people were injured in three explosions at the Arizona Daily Star and Tucson Newspapers Inc.'s plant July 22, 1982. Frank E. Johnson, executive managing editor; Frank C. Delehanty, the paper's controller, treasurer and business manager; Wayne Bean, production manager; and Jack Sheaffer, the Star's chief photographer were critically injured.
 Frank Delehanty died of infections from his injuries August 29, 1982.

StarNet became an Internet Service Provider and the website for the Star at AZStarNet.com May 5, 1995.
 The website was later changed to tucson.com

It was announced Jan. 30, 2005, that Lee Enterprises Inc. would buy the newspapers owned by Pulitzer Inc. The sale includes the Arizona Daily Star.

Tucson Citizen, a Gannett newspaper, ceased print publication, with the last edition published May 16, 2009.

Press operations for the Star moved to Phoenix May 21, 2019.

Owners of the Star sold the building at 4850 S. Park Ave. for more than $2 million at auction in September 2020.

Awards
In 1981, Star reporters Clark Hallas and Robert B. Lowe won the Pulitzer Prize for Local Investigative Specialized Reporting for their stories about recruiting violations by University of Arizona football coach, Tony Mason.

Court cases

In 1940, the Tucson Citizen and Arizona Daily Star entered into a joint operating agreement (JOA) that was later extended to 1990. The joint company owned equally by the two newspapers was Tucson Newspapers Inc. (TNI) The JOA helped bolster the Tucson Citizen by increasing advertising revenue since ads could now be sold by TNI for both papers.

In 1965, the U.S. government filed a complaint that the new company violated the Sherman Antitrust Act and the Clayton Act. The U.S. Supreme Court agreed, saying the First Amendment does not exempt newspapers from laws aimed at preserving competition.

In response to the decision, Congress passed the Newspaper Preservation Act of 1970 to allow joint operating agreements.

References

External links
 
 
 Arizona Daily Star Archives (1879 to present)
 
 The Arizona Daily Stars 2014 project on SB1070, "State of Confusion," Arizona Daily Star, March, 2014
 The Arizona Daily Stars 2013 series on poverty, "Losing Ground", Arizona Daily Star, August, 2013

Newspapers published in Arizona
Maria Moors Cabot Prize winners
Mass media in Tucson, Arizona
Lee Enterprises publications
Daily newspapers published in the United States
Companies based in Tucson, Arizona
Publications established in 1877
1877 establishments in Arizona Territory